Beer soup is a soup which is usually roux-based and made with beer. In medieval Europe, it was served as a breakfast soup, sometimes poured over bread.

Variations on the recipe use the starchiness of potato as a thickener. The Sorbian version is sweet, with cream and raisins added.

See also
 Beer cake
 Beer can chicken
 List of soups

References

Further reading
 The Soup Book - Louis P. De Gouy - Google Books. Page 79.

Soups
Medieval cuisine
Cheese soups
Beer dishes
Australian soups